Cold Spring Farm may refer to:

Cold Spring Farm (Phippsburg, Maine), listed on the NRHP in Sagadahoc County, Maine
Cold Spring Farm (Todd, Pennsylvania), listed on the NRHP in Pennsylvania
Cold Spring Farm Springhouse, Monroe, PA, listed on the NRHP in Monroe County, Pennsylvania

See also
Cold Spring (disambiguation)